Agustín Vidal (born 8 July 1987) is an Argentine handball player for BM Maristas and defended Argentina at the 2015 World Men's Handball Championship in Qatar.

References

External links
 
 
 

1987 births
Living people
Expatriate handball players
Argentine expatriate sportspeople in Spain
Argentine male handball players
Handball players at the 2016 Summer Olympics
Olympic handball players of Argentina
Place of birth missing (living people)
21st-century Argentine people